Tertiary education fees in Australia are payable for courses at tertiary education institutions. The Commonwealth government provides loans and subsidies to relieve the cost of tertiary education for some students. Some students are supported by the government and are required to pay only part of the cost of tuition, called the "student contribution", and the government pays the balance. Some government supported students can defer payment of their contribution as a HECS-HELP loan. Other domestic students are full fee-paying (non-Commonwealth supported) and do not receive direct government contribution to the cost of their education. Some domestic students in full fee courses can obtain a FEE-HELP loan from the Australian government up to a lifetime limit of $150,000 for medicine, dentistry and veterinary science programs and $104,440 for all other programs.

Australian citizens (and in some cases overseas professionals completing bridging studies in order to be accredited permanent residents) are able to obtain loans from the government under the Higher Education Loan Programme (HELP) which replaced the Higher Education Contribution Scheme (HECS). As of April 2016, the amount of money owed to the Australian government under the HECS scheme was AUD$60 billion and is expected to increase to $180 billion by 2026.

HELP is jointly administered by the Australian Department of Education, Skills and Employment and the Australian Taxation Office (ATO). In addition, qualified students may be entitled to Youth Allowance or Austudy Payment to assist them financially while they are studying. These support payments are means and assets tested. Further assistance is available in the form of scholarships. Overseas students are charged fees for the full cost of their education and are ineligible for HELP loans, but may apply for international scholarships.

History
In 1940, the Curtin Labor Government saw a need for the country to increase the number of university graduates and for more civil and military research. To do this, it dramatically increased the number of scholarships it offered to enter university and allowed women to apply for these scholarships (they were previously exclusive to men). The Menzies Liberal Government also supported and extended the ability of ordinary Australians to attend university.

In the 1960s, the Menzies Government encouraged and funded the establishment of new universities to cater for increasing demand. These universities were built in outlying suburbs and offered special research scholarships to encourage students to undertake postgraduate research studies. Many of the universities that were established under this scheme are members of Innovative Research Universities Australia.

In 1967, the Government created a category of non-university tertiary institution (called College of Advanced Education (CAE)) that would be funded by the Commonwealth. These CAEs were easier to access and cheaper to attend than the traditional university, while delivering many university-equivalent bachelor's degrees.

Abolition of university fees 
During the early 1970s, there was a significant push to make tertiary education in Australia more accessible to working and middle class Australians. The Whitlam Labor Government abolished university fees on 1 January 1974. By the mid-1980s, however, there was consensus between both major parties that the concept of 'free' tertiary education in Australia was untenable due to the increasing participation rate.

Introduction of HECS 
In 1989, the Hawke Labor Government began gradually re-introducing fees for university study. It set up the Higher Education Contributions Scheme (HECS), which was first proposed by Professor Murray Wells and subsequently developed by economist and lecturer at the Australian National University, Bruce Chapman and championed by Education Minister John Dawkins (see Dawkins Revolution). Under the original HECS, a $1,800 fee was charged to all university students, and the Commonwealth paid the balance. A student could defer payment of this HECS amount (in which case it was called a HECS debt) and repay the debt through the tax system, when the student's income exceeds a threshold level. As part of the reforms, Colleges of Advanced Education entered the University sector by various means. The HECS system was accepted by both federal political parties and has survived until today, though with a number of changes.

Howard and Rudd government reforms: 1996–2012 
In 1996, the new Howard Coalition Government, while otherwise retaining the HECS system, created a three-tier HECS fee structure. Fees were charged on the basis of the perceived value of courses. Courses considered to have most likelihood of generating higher income for students in the future (e.g. Law and Medicine) were the most expensive and those least likely to generate higher income (e.g. Nursing and Arts) were the least expensive. At the same time, HECS charges increased by an average of 40%.

From 2007, HECS places became known as Commonwealth supported places (CSP). A student in a CSP was only entitled to study for a maximum of 7 years full-time (16 years part-time) at CSP rates. This was known as a student learning entitlement (SLE). After that period the student had to take either a post-graduate FEE-HELP loan (if available) or study at full-fee rates. SLE was abolished from 1 January 2012.

The HECS debt became a pre-2005 debt, while a post-2005 debt is called HECS-HELP, which operates on the same principles as HECS. If a student receives a HECS-HELP loan, the Commonwealth government pays the loan amount directly to the higher education provider on behalf of the student.

An alternative option is FEE-HELP (formerly PELS) which provides eligible fee-paying students with a loan to cover their postgraduate fees. This option is only available for post-graduate students attempting an eligible post-graduate course. In 2012, the FEE-HELP lifelong limit was $89,706, and $112,134 for students studying dentistry, medicine or veterinary science.

Prior to 2012, when a student had used up SLE, he or she could enrol on a full-fee basis. Full-fee courses are relatively expensive because the student must pay the total cost or if eligible, defer the fee on FEE-HELP, resulting in a significantly larger debt than a HECS-HELP debt for the student contribution portion of a Commonwealth supported course. From 1 January 2012, SLE was abolished and students could continue to study for more than 7 years full-time or equivalent part-time in Commonwealth supported courses. FEE-HELP courses are available at a post-graduate level (and occasionally for some undergraduate full-fee places); however, they are not available at every institution or in every course. The only remaining option is a full-fee place paid upfront.

The discount for voluntary repayments of a pre-2005 HECS debt was reduced from 15% to 10% from 1 January 2005. On 1 January 2012, the voluntary repayment discount was reduced to 5%, and was removed completely from 1 January 2017.

2017 changes
Changes to funding of universities and the HECS were made as part of the 2017 Australian federal budget. University funding is to be reduced by 2.5%, and university fees are to go up by $2,000 to $3,600 for a four-year course, an increase of 1.8% in 2018, and 7.5% by 2022. From 1 July 2018, the income level at which HECS debt repayments start will be reduced, from $55,000 to $42,000.

2022 Changes
SLE was reintroduced from 1 January 2022.

University fees
In 1996, the Howard government permitted universities to create full-fee places on which they could charge full up-front fees to students who missed out on a HECS place (with the notable exception of medical degrees). In 2005, the Howard government permitted universities to increase fees by up to 25%.

During the term of the Abbott Government, Education Minister Christopher Pyne consistently sought to fully deregulate university fees. Pyne's proposal would have allowed universities to set their own fees according to the student demand, and graduates who moved offshore to start paying through the tax system. The proposed reforms were unsuccessful, being rejected by the Senate in 2015. University tuition fee and regulation reform remain part of the Liberal-National Coalition Government's policy. The Government released the Driving Innovation Fairness and Excellence in Australian Higher Education consultation paper, in May 2016 proposing a new set of reforms (for consultation).

In the 2017 Australian federal budget, University funding will be reduced by 2.5%. University fees will go up by $2,000 to $3,600 for a four-year course, an increase of 1.8% in 2018, and 7.5% by 2022. From 1 July 2018, the income level at which HECS debt repayments start will be reduced, from $55,000 to $42,000.

Commonwealth supported students (CSP) 
In 2007, HECS places became known as Commonwealth supported places (CSP). The Commonwealth government determines the number and allocation of undergraduate Commonwealth supported places with each public higher education provider each year, through the Commonwealth Grant Scheme (CGS). A CSP is a higher education place for which the Commonwealth government makes a contribution to the higher education provider towards the cost of a student's education. The student makes a contribution towards the cost of education, known as the student contribution. Commonwealth supported places are available to citizens of Australia and New Zealand and Australian permanent residents.

The majority of CSPs are managed through the tertiary admissions centre in each state or territory (although universities make the selections, deciding which students they will make offers to): 
 Universities Admissions Centre (UAC) in NSW and ACT
 Queensland Tertiary Admissions Centre
 South Australian Tertiary Admissions Centre in South Australia and the Northern Territory
 University of Tasmania in Tasmania
 Victorian Tertiary Admissions Centre (VTAC) in Victoria
 Tertiary Institutions Service Centre in Western Australia.

The allocation is usually based on secondary school results (through the ATAR or OP scores), TAFE qualifications and previous university results.

The student contribution varies between courses, and is based on the expected earnings following a students' graduation, not the cost of providing the course. Higher education providers can set the student contribution level for each unit of study, up to a maximum level set by the government. It is said that, due to government underfunding of universities, universities almost always charge the highest level allowable.

Between 2012 and 2017, an eligible student who paid the entire or a part of the student contribution upfront received a 10% HECS discount on the amount paid (prior to 2012, the HECS discount was 20%). Only Australian citizens and permanent humanitarian visa holders were eligible for the up-front 10% HECS discount. The up-front discount was removed on 1 January 2017.

Total Funding 
The total funding available to institutions per equivalent full-time student is the combination of the student contribution (divided into 3 different amounts/bands) and the Commonwealth government contribution (divided into 8 different amounts/clusters). For 2017 these are:

Full fee-paying students
Full fee places for Australian undergraduate students were phased out in 2009 under reforms made by the Gillard government.

Other students may obtain a full fee place (FFP) if they do not receive a Commonwealth supported place, subject to meeting relevant qualifications. Most postgraduate courses do not have Commonwealth supported places available and therefore, all these students are full fee-paying. Fee-paying students are charged the full cost of their course, with no Commonwealth contribution.

Some fee-paying students can obtain loans under the Higher Education Loan Programme, called FEE-HELP loans, to cover all or part of their fees. This is available to Australian citizens, New Zealand citizens and permanent humanitarian visa holders. Undergraduate students who obtain these loans are charged a 20% loan fee on top of the amount borrowed. This does not apply to post graduate courses. Students are able to borrow a lifetime maximum FEE-HELP loan of $112,134 for medicine, dentistry and veterinary science programs and $89,706 for all other programs (adjusted for inflation). In 2005, FEE-HELP loans replaced the Open Learning Deferred Payment Scheme (OLDPS), the Postgraduate Education Loan Scheme (PELS) and the Bridging for Overseas-Trained Professionals Loan Scheme (BOTPLS).

OS-HELP
OS-HELP is a loan scheme to assist some undergraduate domestic students to undertake some, but not all, of their course of study overseas. Students are able to obtain a loan up to $6,470 (if the student will not be studying in Asia) or $7764 (if the student will be studying in Asia) for every six months, but can only receive a total of two loans throughout their lifetime. Unlike other loans in the HELP, the loan amount is paid directly to the student and the terms for the loans are set out by the tertiary providers.

As in the FEE-HELP loan scheme, a 20% fee applies on the amount borrowed. This 20% "administration fee" was removed for OS-HELP loans received after 1 January 2010.

HELP loans

HELP loan management
HELP debts do not attract interest (in the normal sense), but are instead indexed to the Consumer Price Index (CPI) on 1 June each year, based on the annual CPI to March of that year. The indexation rate applied on 1 June 2006 was 2.8% and 3.4% on 1 June 2007. Indexation applies to the part of the debt that has been unpaid for 11 months or more. Thus, indexation is calculated on the opening HELP debt balance on 1 July of the previous year plus any debt incurred in the first half of the current year (usually for first semester courses) less any compulsory and voluntary repayments, with bonus. Any HELP debt incurred on second semester courses (usually determined in June) will not be subject to indexation until the next year. After indexation, the new balance is rounded down to a whole dollar amount. Additionally, HELP debts are subject to a 25% fee which does not count towards a student’s HELP debt limit.

As of 1 January 2017 the Commonwealth Government removed the 5% voluntary repayment bonus on all HELP debt repayments.

If a person with an accumulated HELP debt dies, any compulsory repayment included on their income
tax notice of assessment relating to the period prior to their death must be paid
from their estate, but the remainder of their debt is cancelled.

Repayments
HELP debts are administered by the Australian Taxation Office and will be repaid compulsorily over time through the taxation system. If the HELP Repayment Income (HRI) of a person with a HELP debt exceeds a certain threshold, which for the 2014/15 financial year is $53,345, a compulsory payments will be deducted from the person's tax for the year. The HRI is the person's taxable income plus any net rental loss claimed against that taxable income and adding fringe benefits, reportable superannuation contributions and foreign income received, normally exempt from taxation.

Unlike marginal tax rates, the repayment rate applies on the full HRI, so that a person with a HRI below $45,881 in 2019/20 will not need to make a compulsory HELP repayment, but a person with a HRI of $80,000 would make a payment of $4,400. This is 5.5% of the HRI (not taxable income or the debt balance) of $80,000. The compulsory repayment amount cannot exceed the balance of the HELP debt.

The rates for compulsory repayment since 2006 have been:

It is also possible to make voluntary payments to further reduce the debt. Until 31 December 2004 voluntary payments over $500 earned a 15% bonus, from 1 January 2005 this was reduced to 10% and from 1 January 2012 this was reduced to 5%. From 1 January 2017 the Government removed the 5% repayment bonus.

See also
 Tertiary education in Australia
 Education in Australia
 Taxation in Australia

References

Citations

Sources 

 StudyAssist website
 Department of Education, Employment and Workplace Relations website (previously Department of Education, Science and Training)
 ATO Higher education loan schemes essentials site
"International student funding comparisons: Australia and New Zealand" by Professor Nicholas Barr. The Guardian, 9 October 2001.

External links
 StudyAssist website
 Department of Education and Training website
 ATO Higher education loan schemes essentials site

Universities in Australia
Australia
Taxation in Australia
Education economics
Education finance in Australia